Major-General Sir John Munro Sym KCB (1839–1919) was a Scottish military officer who commanded the 5th Gurkha Rifles.

Life

He was born on 15 February 1839 in Edinburgh one of eight children to Rev John Sym (1809–1855), minister of the famous Greyfriars Kirk, and his wife Catherine Glassford Munro. The family lived at 37 George Square a short distance from the church.

He trained as a soldier and spent most of his career in the Indian Army.

In 1910 he was living at 4 Belgrave Place in western Edinburgh.

He died in Edinburgh on 2 October 1919. His is buried with his son George Munro Sym (1883–1898) in the first northern extension of Dean Cemetery in western Edinburgh.

Family

He was married Eliza D'Oyley Vincent (1848-1927).

References

1839 births
1919 deaths
Military personnel from Edinburgh
Burials at the Dean Cemetery
British Indian Army generals
Gurkhas
Knights Commander of the Order of the Bath